Events from the year 1828 in Ireland.

Events
In the election in County Clare, Daniel O'Connell wins the seat, with the Catholic Association.
Belfast Botanic Gardens opens as the private Royal Belfast Botanical Gardens.
Kings Bridge opens across the River Liffey in Dublin.

Births
1 January – Richard Phelan, fourth Roman Catholic Bishop of Pittsburgh, Pennsylvania (died 1904 in the United States).
17 January – Eyre Massey Shaw, first Chief Officer of the Metropolitan Fire Brigade (London) (died 1908 in England).
28 January – William Gorman Wills, dramatist and painter (died 1891).
21 March – William Davis Ardagh, lawyer, judge and politician in Canada (died 1893 in the United States).
March – Patrick Cleburne, major general in Confederate States Army in the American Civil War (killed at the Battle of Franklin, 1864 in the United States).
23 April – Fenton John Anthony Hort, theologian and writer (died 1892).
28 April – Wingfield W. Watson, leader of the Church of Jesus Christ of Latter Day Saints (Strangite) (died 1922 in the United States).
9 May – Charles Kickham, Irish revolutionary, novelist, poet, journalist (died 1882).
11 May – William Walsh, U.S. Congressman in Maryland (died 1892 in the United States).
15 June – Thomas Newenham Deane, architect (died 1899).
27 June
Cornelius Coughlan, soldier, recipient of the Victoria Cross for gallantry in 1857 at Delhi, India (died 1915).
Bryan O'Loghlen, politician in Australia, 13th Premier of Victoria (died 1905 in Australia).
26 August – William Plunket, 4th Baron Plunket, Church of Ireland Archbishop of Dublin (died 1897).
22 September – Canon James Goodman, Irish music collector (died 1896).
22 November – Lydia Shackleton, botanical artist (died 1914).
27 November – Samuel Mullen, bookseller (died 1890).
31 December – Fitz James O'Brien, author (died 1862).
Full date unknown
John Holmes, surveyor and politician in Ontario (died 1879 in New Zealand).
Joshua Spencer Thompson, Liberal-Conservative politician in Canada (died 1880 in Canada).

Deaths
9 January – Alexander Arbuthnot, Church of Ireland Bishop of Killaloe (born 1768).
29 June – Samuel Forde, painter from Cork (born 1805).
23 August – John Foster, 1st Baron Oriel, politician and Irish Chancellor of the Exchequer (born 1740).

References

 
Years of the 19th century in Ireland
1820s in Ireland
Ireland
 Ireland